César Franck's Piano Quintet in F minor is a quintet for piano, 2 violins, viola, and cello. The work was composed in 1879 and has been described as one of Franck's chief achievements alongside his other late works such as Symphony in D minor, the Symphonic Variations, the String Quartet, and the Violin Sonata.

The work was premiered by the Marsick Quartet, with Camille Saint-Saëns playing the piano part, which Franck had written out for him with an appended note: "To my good friend Camille Saint-Saëns". A minor scandal ensued when at the piece's completion, Saint-Saëns walked off stage leaving the score open at the piano, a gesture which was interpreted as mark of disdain. That manuscript is now in the  The published form issued by Hamelle in 1880, carries the simpler dedication "".

The work has been described as having a "torrid emotional power", and Édouard Lalo characterized it as an "explosion". Other critics have been less positively impressed: Philosopher Roger Scruton has written of the quintet's "unctuous narcissism".

Structure 
There are three movements:
 Molto moderato quasi lento – Allegro
 Lento con molto sentimento
 Allegro non troppo ma con fuoco

The music has a cyclical character whereby a motto theme of two four-bar phrases, used 18 times in the first movement, recurs at strategic point later in the work.

References

External links

Compositions by César Franck
Franck, Cesar
1879 compositions